Figures in a Landscape is a 1970 British film directed by Joseph Losey and written by star Robert Shaw. It is based on the 1968 novel of the same name by Barry England with a screenplay by Robert Shaw.

Plot
Two men run across a beach at dawn with their hands are tied behind their backs. After several shots of a helicopter frantically searching the landscape, it becomes apparent that the two men are escapees of some kind. It is later revealed that their names are MacConnachie and Ansell. The two continue running across barren land, trying to escape the sight of the helicopter. MacConnachie continuously berates Ansell as they run, showing that he is the leader, more or less.

The duo eventually get away from the helicopter and find a goat herder. MacConnachie sneaks up and kills him hoping to find any useful supplies, but does not find anything. The action, however, greatly upsets Ansell. They continue on through harsh terrain, sometimes being found by the helicopter, but they manage to escape again.

One night, they come across a small town. They sneak through, and get into a house, where the only inhabitant is a lonely widow sitting in a chair next to the bed of her presumably deceased husband. She doesn't seem to notice they are there, but she does however seem to be guarding a basket of bread. The two ignore her and loot the house, finding many supplies and even a rifle. While Ansell prepares to leave, MacConnachie takes a piece of bread from the woman's basket, causing her to drop out of her trance and scream, causing them to flee as the townspeople are alarmed. At the town limits, Ansell tells MacConnachie that he wants to continue travelling with him, which is against MacConnachie's idea of splitting up. He eventually consents and the two continue on. Ansell reveals that he formerly worked at Fortnum & Mason, in London.

They come across the helicopter again in the mountains. They come up with a plan for Ansell to distract the helicopter while MacConnachie shoots its gas tank in order to destroy it. Ansell goes to distract it, but instead of shooting the gas tank, MacConnachie shoots the observer in the helicopter's passenger seat. Ansell protests, but MacConnachie tells him that he did it to show power over the helicopter and to avoid injuring Ansell in a possible explosion. They also find a sub machine gun with the observer's dead body.

After being pursued by ground troops through a field, they then come across a military compound where the helicopter goes to refuel. They try to sneak through, but are caught, and are forced to fight and escape, in the process shooting up the parked helicopter. They continue travelling across a mountain range afterwards where the ice is melting.

Eventually, they arrive at a snow peaked mountain, which seems to be what they were searching for the entire trip. At the top there is a military post, presumably at the border, and several soldiers who come out to greet them. Ansell is overjoyed and runs out to them, though MacConnachie hears a kind of noise from behind him, which is the helicopter. Before joining Ansell, he decides to stage a last stand battle between himself and the helicopter. Despite shooting it many times, the helicopter fires at MacConnachie, killing him. Ansell feels remorse, but eventually returns with the soldiers to the compound.

Cast
 Robert Shaw – MacConnachie
 Malcolm McDowell – Ansell
 Henry Woolf – Helicopter pilot
 Christopher Malcolm – Helicopter observer
 Andrew Bradford – Soldier
 Warwick Sims – Soldier
 Roger Lloyd-Pack – Soldier
 Robert East – Soldier
 Tariq Yunus – Soldier
 Pamela Brown – Widow

Production
Shaw says he was paid $500,000 to do the film.

The production took four months to film, between June and October 1969. It was shot in Sierra Nevada, Province of Granada, Andalucia, Spain. During pre-production, many of the film's crew were replaced, such as Peter Medak as director and Peter O'Toole as star. At the time of filming, Robert Shaw was a quite well known star, whereas Malcolm McDowell was still relatively unknown as it was made in the period after If.... but before A Clockwork Orange.

The helicopter featured, an Aérospatiale Alouette II, XZ-2B2, based at Armilla, Granada, was flown by Gilbert Chomat.

Style
The film was quite revolutionary with its use of mystery to the audience; the characters, background, and location all go unknown throughout the entire film. The only information on the characters is revealed through dialogue. Whereas the book reveals the characters to be soldiers, this never comes up in the film. The film also makes much use of long takes, mainly in the shots which take place in the helicopter, the long takes signify the helicopter's long search.

References

External links
 

1970 films
1970 war films
1970s thriller films
British thriller films
British mystery films
British war films
British aviation films
Prisoner of war films
Films directed by Joseph Losey
Films scored by Richard Rodney Bennett
Films shot in Almería
1970s English-language films
1970s British films